International Dawn Chorus Day is a Canadian short experimental documentary film, directed by John Greyson and released in 2021. Taking its name from the observance of International Dawn Chorus Day, when people are encouraged to listen to birdsong, the film features the participation of 40 international filmmakers and artists who recorded birdsong for a Zoom call in tribute to deceased Egyptian activists Shady Habash and Sarah Hegazi.

Participants included Sofia Bohdanowicz, AA Bronson, Julie Burleigh, Shu Lea Cheang, Sheila Davis, Richard Fung, Rebecca Garrett, Shohini Ghosh, Maureen Greyson, Sharon Hayashi, DeeDee Halleck, Nelson Henricks, April Hickox, Michelle Jacques, Nancy Kim, Prabha Khosla, Lyne Lapointe, Stephen Lawson, Jack Lewis, Catherine Lord, Loring McAlpin, Alexis Mitchell, Maki Mizukoshi, Ken Morrison, Daniel Negatu, Martha Newbigging, Jane Park, Pamela Rodgerson, Su Rynard, Lior Shamriz, Amil Shivji, Cheryl Sourkes, Dieylani Sow, Richard Tillmann, Almerinda Travassos, David Wall, BH Yael, and three Egyptian personalities who contributed anonymously due to the risk of political retribution by the government of Egypt.

The film premiered in the short film program at the 71st Berlin International Film Festival, where it won the Teddy Award for best LGBTQ-themed short film.

References

External links
 

2021 films
2021 short documentary films
2021 LGBT-related films
Canadian short documentary films
Canadian LGBT-related short films
Films directed by John Greyson
English-language Canadian films
2020s English-language films
2020s Canadian films